

187001–187100 

|-bgcolor=#f2f2f2
| colspan=4 align=center | 
|}

187101–187200 

|-id=123
| 187123 Schorderet ||  || Jean-Marcel Schorderet (born 1935), retired director and producer at the Schweizer Fernsehen of the Swiss Broadcasting Corporation || 
|-id=125
| 187125 Marxgyörgy ||  || György Marx (1927–2002), a Hungarian physicist and astrophysicist. || 
|}

187201–187300 

|-id=276
| 187276 Meistas ||  || Edmundas Meistas (born 1936), a Lithuanian astronomer and writer of popular science articles. Expert in stellar photometry, his research includes the structure of galaxies, interstellar extinction, and asteroseismology of white dwarfs. || 
|-id=283
| 187283 Jeffhopkins ||  || Jeffrey Hopkins (born 1940), leading amateur photometrist || 
|}

187301–187400 

|-bgcolor=#f2f2f2
| colspan=4 align=center | 
|}

187401–187500 

|-id=447
| 187447 Johnmester ||  || John Clark Mester (born 1961), an American physicist and former Associate Vice President for Research at the University of Arizona, who was involved in the development and launch of the Gravity Probe B, a satellite-based experiment to test two unverified predictions of general relativity. || 
|}

187501–187600 

|-id=514
| 187514 Tainan ||  || Tainan is located in southern Taiwan and is the oldest and the fifth-largest city on the island || 
|-id=531
| 187531 Omorichugakkou ||  || Omorichugakkou is the name of the junior high school in Suzaka-shi, Nagano prefecture, Japan. Students discovered this minor planet during one of the commemoration events for the 60th anniversary of the school's founding. || 
|}

187601–187700 

|-id=636
| 187636 Chungyuan ||  || The Chung Yuan Christian University (CYCU, formerly Chung Yuan Christian College of Science and Engineering) was established in October 1955 and upgraded to the status of a full university in August 1980. After five decades, CYCU has more than 120,000 alumni. || 
|-id=638
| 187638 Greenewalt ||  || Crawford Greenewalt (1902–1993), an American chemical engineer who witnessed Fermi's first atomic chain reaction in 1942 || 
|-id=679
| 187679 Folinsbee ||  || Robert E. Folinsbee (1917–2008), a Canadian geologist at the University of Alberta || 
|-id=680
| 187680 Stelck ||  || Charles R. Stelck (1917–2016), Canadian paleontologist, stratigrapher and teacher || 
|-id=700
| 187700 Zagreb ||  || The city of Zagreb, capital and the largest city of Croatia || 
|}

187701–187800 

|-id=707
| 187707 Nandaxianlin ||  || Nandaxianlin is the new campus of Nanjing University || 
|-id=709
| 187709 Fengduan ||  || Feng Duan (1923–), Chinese physicist and member of the Chinese Academy of Sciences || 
|}

187801–187900 

|-bgcolor=#f2f2f2
| colspan=4 align=center | 
|}

187901–188000 

|-id=981
| 187981 Soluri ||  || Michael R. Soluri (born 1946), a documentary photographer who worked as the official project photographer for the New Horizons mission to Pluto || 
|}

References 

187001-188000